Parks in Hong Kong may refer to:

 Conservation in Hong Kong (which covers country parks and special areas)
 Marine parks in Hong Kong
 Urban public parks and gardens in Hong Kong